Robert Hamlett Bremner (1917-2002) was professor emeritus of history at the Ohio State University in Columbus, Ohio where he taught from 1946 until he retired in 1980. He is the author of American Philanthropy (1960) which was republished in a revised edition in 1988, The Public Good: Philanthropy and Welfare in the Civil War Period in 1980, and  'Giving: Charity and Philanthropy in History in 1996.

Education
His BA was from Baldwin Wallace College in 1938. He earned his MA in 1939 and his PhD in 1943 from Ohio State University.

Early career
He worked with the Department of War in World War II  and was stationed in Europe and in Washington, D.C.

Career

His American Philanthropy published in 1960 is considered to be a classic. He published The Public Good: Philanthropy and Welfare in the Civil War Period in 1980, The Discovery of Poverty in the United States in 1992, and Giving: Charity and Philanthropy in History'' in 1996. His archives are held at Ohio State University.

Academic career
At Ohio State University, he taught from 1946 until his retirement in 1980 as Emeritus Professor of History.

Appointments
He served on the President's Science Advisory Committee.

References

20th-century American historians
Ohio State University alumni
1917 births
2002 deaths
20th-century American male writers